Zhuravka-Pervaya is a rural locality (a selo) and the administrative center of Zhuravskoye Rural Settlement, Prokhorovsky District, Belgorod Oblast, Russia. The population was 608 as of 2010. There are 13 streets.

Geography 
Zhuravka-Pervaya is located 23 km northeast of Prokhorovka (the district's administrative centre) by road. Zhuravka-Vtoraya is the nearest rural locality.

References 

Rural localities in Prokhorovsky District